Georgios Kiourkos (born 15 September 1971) is a retired Greek football striker.

References

1971 births
Living people
Chaidari F.C. players
Kalamata F.C. players
Kallithea F.C. players
Panionios F.C. players
Leonidio F.C. players
Ethnikos Asteras F.C. players
Ethnikos Piraeus F.C. players
Super League Greece players
Association football forwards
Footballers from Athens
Greek footballers